Grammothele africana is a poroid crust fungus in the family Polyporaceae. Found in Uganda, it was described as new to science in 2005 by mycologists Perpetua Ipulet  and Leif Ryvarden. The type was collected in Bwindi Impenetrable National Park, where it was found growing on rotting fallen branches.

References

africana
Fungi described in 2005
Fungi of Africa
Taxa named by Leif Ryvarden